St. Cecilia Academy is a historic religious building in Nashville, Tennessee, U.S..

History
The building was built on a mansion designed in the Greek Revival architectural style for John F. Erwin and his wife Lavinia Robertson Erwin. By 1903, three more houses were joined together to become home to the first Roman Catholic school in the state of Tennessee. It is now home to the convent for the Dominican Sisters of Saint Cecilia.

The building has been listed on the National Register of Historic Places since December 12, 1976.

References

Buildings and structures on the National Register of Historic Places in Tennessee
School buildings completed in 1862
Buildings and structures in Nashville, Tennessee